Russell Cross (born September 5, 1961) is an American former professional basketball player who was selected by the National Basketball Association's Golden State Warriors in the first round (6th pick overall) of the 1983 NBA draft.

College career

Russell Cross attended and played basketball at Manley High School, located on the West Side of Chicago. He led Manley to an Illinois state title; he was selected to the McDonald's All-American team and was also a first-team Parade All-American; he was also the Parade Player of the Year.  The 6'10" center moved on to attend Purdue University, where he played his freshman season under first year head coach, Gene Keady. In his first season as a Boilermaker, he set a freshman record with 540 points on the season and led Purdue to an NIT third-place finish and to a 21–11 record. In his sophomore season, Cross helped lead them to the NIT Finals with All-Big Ten teammate, Keith Edmonson. In his junior season, he led Purdue to a 21–9 record and onto a Second Round NCAA Tournament appearance. Russell was named First Team All-Big Ten his junior year.

Professional career

Russell Cross skipped his senior year at Purdue to enter the 1983 NBA draft, where he was selected as the 6th pick in the first round by the Golden State Warriors. Cross played in only one NBA season, averaging 3.7 points in 45 games for the Warriors in the 1983-84 NBA season. Cross then signed a contract with the Denver Nuggets, he did not appear in a game and was waived late in the 1984–85 season. He spent the remainder of the 1984–85 season and the 1985–86 season with the Louisville Catbirds and then moved to Europe, where he spent the next seven seasons in the Italian and Spanish Leagues.

References

External links
Career statistics

1961 births
Living people
American expatriate basketball people in Italy
American expatriate basketball people in Spain
American men's basketball players
Basket Napoli players
Basketball players from Chicago
CB Breogán players
Centers (basketball)
Golden State Warriors draft picks
Golden State Warriors players
La Crosse Catbirds players
Liga ACB players
Louisville Catbirds players
McDonald's High School All-Americans
Parade High School All-Americans (boys' basketball)
Purdue Boilermakers men's basketball players